Noonday Underground are a British band consisting of DJ Simon Dine and singer Daisy Martey. Dine had previously been a member of Adventures in Stereo. Martey was for a time the singer in Morcheeba. The band name came from a book about The Who.

Their debut album Self-Assembly was released in 2000 on the M21 label, and re-issued by Setanta on 17 September 2001.

Their track "The Light Brigade", from Self-Assembly, was used as the title theme for the Channel 4 nursing drama, No Angels.

An advertisement for Google Home used their track "Spinning All Around", from the album Body Parts For Modern Art.

Discography 
Albums
 Self-Assembly (2000) M21
 Surface Noise (2002) Setanta
 On the Freedom Flotilla (2006) Setanta
 The K-O Chorale (12 July 2010) Setanta
 Body Parts for Modern Art (2015) Stubbie Records
 On a Quiet Night (2018)
Compilations
 Set Sail (2003) Vroom Sound
EPs
 How Happy (1997)
Singles
 "London" (1999)
 "I'll Walk Right On" (2003) (UK Singles Chart #86)

References

External links 
 

British electronic music groups